Boris Ivanovich Gulyayev (born 22 April 1941) is a former Soviet speedskater. On 13 January 1970 he set a new world record in the 500 m at 0:39.03 at Medeo. He finished in 15th place in the same event at the 1964 Winter Olympics.

Gulyayev graduated from an institute of physical education in Yekaterinburg, and in 1982 defended a PhD at the Moscow Institute of Physical Education (GKTsOLIFK) on improving physical fitness of junior speedskaters. After that he returned to Yekaterinburg and worked as a lecturer and sports functionary.

Personal bests:
 500 m – 39.03 (1970)
 1500 m – 2:06.9 (1968)
 5000 m – 9:02.2 (1968)

References

External links 
 

1941 births
Living people
Russian male speed skaters
Soviet male speed skaters
World record setters in speed skating
Olympic speed skaters of the Soviet Union
Speed skaters at the 1964 Winter Olympics